Avalon is the first solo studio album by American rock musician Sully Erna, released on September 14, 2010. Avalon is a combination of work that took Sully Erna almost seven years to complete.

Background
In October 2006, Launch Radio Networks reported that Sully Erna has started working on his solo album. Although he wasn't exactly sure what shape it will take, Erna told Launch Radio Networks that "I've been putting some thought into it," he said. "I actually have some stuff that I'm doing on the side right now. I don't know when I'm gonna kind of unleash something like that, and I don't know really what it's gonna be yet. I have a couple of different ideas, and I'm not sure what and when it's gonna happen, but of course Godsmack is our lifeblood and we don't have any plans on trying to break this thing up. But, you know, we do want to venture out a little bit and just do some side stuff."

While other Godsmack members were busy with their side project, Another Animal, it was reported by The Pulse of Radio that Sully Erna has officially launched his solo tour. The tour started on May 1, 2008, and ended on August 1, 2008. During the tour, Erna performed "Eyes of a Child", and "Until Then". Both songs are not featured on any known Godsmack album or compilation.

During 2008, many people questioned the future of Godsmack, and rumors began swirling. Sully Erna put those rumors to rest, stating "The band's in great shape. We're getting along wonderfully, and there's no problems whatsoever. We all know this is an entity we can't just shut down; it's gonna continue to go, and everybody's just kinda doing something on the side that's...a little different than what we'd do from Godsmack."

In March 2009, It was reported that Sully Erna has finished recording his first solo album, entitled Avalon. According to Erna, Avalon is a combination of work that took him almost seven years to complete. Erna described Avalon as his best work to date, stating "I truly believe that this is my best work to date. I'm more proud of this record than any other music I have ever recorded."

Sound
Sully Erna described the album as being "A very different kind of sounding record," and "A huge departure from anything I've ever done." When interviewed by Billboard.com, Erna described the sound of his upcoming solo album as being very Native American tribal rhythms, stating "It's gonna be very Native American tribal rhythms mixed with these Middle Eastern bluesy kind of vocals. This is a project to get a different kind of music out of me that I feel is inside me. .. and not for any expectations about how big the hit may be or if it's gonna make it on the radio."

In further describing the album's sound, Sully Erna posted a message on the band official forums, stating:

Erna goes on to explain that the album was recorded with instruments such as hand drums, cellos, flutes and piano, making it very different from his signature sound with Godsmack.

The album features Lisa Guyer who had performed backing vocals for the song "Hollow" on Godsmack's previous album, classically trained cellist Irina Chirkova, and percussionist Niall Gregory of Dead Can Dance.

Title

According to Sully Erna, the album was named after one of the songs on the album, entitled "Avalon", because it encompasses the album as a whole, stating:

Promotion

In order to promote his solo album, Sully Erna has taken a different approach to getting his new music heard, stating "What we’re doing right now is just speaking with a lot of different film companies to see what movies are coming out this year and next year and trying to attach some of the songs to that."

On September 25, Sully Erna told the Artisan News Service in a video interview that he was approached to record "Sinner's Prayer" for 2010's Sylvester Stallone film The Expendables, which will also feature Jason Statham, Jet Li, Mickey Rourke and Randy Couture. A few months later, however, Erna stated that the song won't be featured in that movie because Stallone changed the scene the song was attached to.

Singles
"Sinner's Prayer" featuring singer Lisa Guyer is the lead single from the album. Universal Records sent the song to U.S. radio on August 3, 2010. The song became available as a digital download on August 3, 2010. 
A music video of the song featuring Sully Erna's solo band members performing the song was released on September 15, 2010.

Release
Avalon was released on September 14, 2010 through Universal Records.

Critical reception
Upon its release, Avalon received generally positive reviews from music critics.

James Christopher Monger of AllMusic gave the album three and a half out of five stars, and praised Erna's inventive and new musical approach, writing "...there's a lot to be said for managing to crank out such a powerful product with all of the amps turned off". He added, "That sound expands to an even greater extent on the single “Sinner’s Prayer,” bolstered by guest vocalist Lisa Guyer, Bulgarian cellist Irina Chirkova, and Dead Can Dance percussionist Niall Gregory."

Commercial performance
The album debuted at number twenty-four on the US Billboard 200 chart with first-week sales of nearly 14,000 copies.

Track listing

Note
"The Departed" is an iTunes bonus track on the deluxe edition of The Oracle by Godsmack with slightly different lyrics at the end of the second verse.
Singles are 
 Avalon
 Broken Road
 Sinner's Prayer
 Until Then...
 The Departed
 Eyes of a Child

Personnel

 Sully Erna – lead vocals, piano, acoustic guitar, producer
 Lisa Guyer – vocals
 Irina Chirkova – cello
 Niall Gregory – percussion
 Tim Theriault – guitar, backing vocals
 Chris Decato – keyboards, backing vocals
 Chris Lester – bass, acoustic guitar, mandolin, backing vocals

 David Stefanelli – drums
 Joe Clapp – engineer
 Angelo Caputo – engineer
 Steve Catizone – engineer, keyboards
 David Pier – engineer
 Andrew Murdock – mixing

Charts

Release history

References

External links
 Sully Erna official website
 Sully Erna's Avalon: myth, mist or must? Album Review

2010 debut albums
Republic Records albums
Sully Erna albums